Allen Isaiah "Dutch" Romberger (May 26, 1927 – May 26, 1983) was an American professional baseball player. The right-handed pitcher had a 13-season career (1948–59; 1961) in minor league baseball, but made only ten appearances in the Major Leagues for the 1954 Philadelphia Athletics.

A native of Klingerstown, Pennsylvania, Romberger signed with the Athletics in 1948. He split 1954, his seventh pro season, between the Triple-A Ottawa Athletics and the big-league squad, playing its 54th and last season in Philadelphia. All of his ten appearances came in relief, and he was ineffective, allowing 28 hits, three home runs and 12 bases on balls in 12 innings pitched, with six strikeouts. However, he earned his only MLB victory on June 19 at Briggs Stadium. Called into the game in the seventh inning with Philadelphia trailing 4–0, Romberger set down the Detroit Tigers in order. Then, in the top of the eighth, the Athletics tallied five runs and came away with a 5–4 win.

Romberger was a successful minor league pitcher, compiling a 111–72 win-loss record (.607) in 462 games, all but 23 of them for the Athletics' organization.

He died on his 56th birthday in Weikert, Pennsylvania.

References

External links

1927 births
1983 deaths
Baseball players from Pennsylvania
Buffalo Bisons (minor league) players
Columbus Jets players
Lincoln A's players
Little Rock Travelers players
Major League Baseball pitchers
Ottawa A's players
People from Schuylkill County, Pennsylvania
Philadelphia Athletics players
Portsmouth A's players
Shreveport Sports players
Sunbury A's players
Toronto Maple Leafs (International League) players